South Indian may refer to:
South India
South Indian, Ontario, renamed Limoges in 1926
The South Indian Ocean